Thomas Häberli (born 11 April 1974) is a Swiss football manager and former player who manages the Estonia national team.

Club career
Häberli was born in Lucerne, Switzerland. He played as midfielder or striker. Häberli started his youth football with the local amateur club FC Eschenbach, based in Eschenbach just outside his hometown of Lucerne in Central Switzerland. In 1987 he moved on to FC Hochdorf, where he came through the ranks and advanced to their first team in the fifth tier of the Swiss football pyramid. In 1994, he moved to FC Le Mont, who had just been promoted to the semi-professional third tier, and are based in Le Mont-sur-Lausanne in the French-speaking region of Switzerland. After just four appearances he was quickly snapped up by their bigger local rivals. In January 1995, aged 20, he signed his first profession contract with top-tier FC Lausanne-Sport. However, he played only for their U-21 team because he was suffering with back problems. This was diagnosed as a spinal disc hernia and so he cancelled his contract with the club and retired from professional football.

For the 1996–97 season, he returned to his former club FC Hochdorf in his home Canton of Lucerne. In 1997, he moved to another local side FC Schötz, based in Schötz. In the summer of 1999, aged 25, Häberli had recovered from his health problems and he felt fit enough to resume his career as professional footballer. He contacted local professional club SC Kriens and asked them for a trial session. He impressed them and was offered a contract. His time at playing in the Swiss Challenge League with Kriens was a success and soon top flight clubs were taking note. Just six months later, in January 2000, he signed for FC Basel under head coach Christian Gross. After playing in eight test games Häberli played his domestic league debut for the club, coming in as substitute during the away game in the Stade Olympique de la Pontaise, on 12 March, as Basel played against goalless draw with Lausanne-Sport. Häberli was used by Gross solely as substitute and again after just six months he moved on.

Häberli moved to Bern to play for BSC Young Boys where he remained until the end of his active career. At that time Häberli was the longest serving player at the club. In the 2007–08 season Häberli scored 18 goals and finished second in the goalscoring charts, behind teammate Hakan Yakin, as BSC Young Boys finished second after defeat to winners FC Basel on the final day of the season. He was contracted to the club until 30 June 2010.

International career
In 2004, he made his only appearance so far for Switzerland against the Faroe Islands.

For UEFA Euro 2008 there was speculation amongst the media and the fans that he would be recalled due to his excellent form, and the injury sustained to Blaise Nkufo. He was recalled into the provisional squad by coach Köbi Kuhn and played in a warm up game with the squad in an unofficial friendly against the U21 side of FC Lugano, scoring a goal. However, when the final squad was announced, the next day, Häberli did not make the final cut.

Coaching career

Young Boys
Häberli was hired as U-18 manager for Young Boys in 2010. After first team manager Vladimir Petkovic was fired, Häberli was appointed as the caretaker manager on 8 May 2011 alongside assistant manager Erminio Piserchia, until the 1 July 2011, where Christian Gross would take over. After the summer, the continued coaching the U-18 squad.

On 30 April 2012, Häberli was promoted to first team assistant manager under manager Martin Rueda. In April 2013 it was announced, that Häberli would take over the U-21 squad of the club.

FC Basel
On 26 April 2013, it was confirmed that Häberli would take charge of FC Basel's U-21 squad from the 2013–14 season. In October 2015, Häberli changed position and was appointed as the club's new talent manager. He held this position until the beginning of the 2018/19 season, where he was appointed as first team assistant manager. Häberli resigned on 3 January 2019.

FC Luzern
On 21 February 2019, he was appointed as the manager of FC Luzern. After a bad start in the 2019-2020 season, he was sacked on 16 December 2019.

Estonia
On 5 January 2021, Häberli was appointed manager of the Estonia national team on a contract due to run until the end of 2022 FIFA World Cup qualification.

Personal life
Häberli is married to Olivia and has two daughters, Lielle and Eline, and lives with them in Ballwil, in Canton Lucerne. The house is next to the farm which his parents live on.

Away from football he counts playing Jass, swimming and reading as his hobbies.

Managerial statistics

Honours

As Manager
Estonia
Baltic Cup: 2020

External links
Swiss Football League profile 
BSC Young Boys profile

References

Living people
1974 births
Association football forwards
Swiss men's footballers
Switzerland international footballers
Swiss Super League players
FC Le Mont players
BSC Young Boys players
FC Basel players
FC Lausanne-Sport players
SC Kriens players
FC Luzern managers
Estonia national football team managers
Swiss football managers
Sportspeople from Lucerne